Chad Griffin Durbin (born December 3, 1977), is an American former professional baseball pitcher, who played in Major League Baseball (MLB) for the Kansas City Royals, Cleveland Indians, and Detroit Tigers of the American League (AL), and the Arizona Diamondbacks, Philadelphia Phillies, and Atlanta Braves of the National League (NL).

Durbin attended Woodlawn High School, in Baton Rouge, Louisiana. He was drafted by the Kansas City Royals, in the 3rd round, 79th overall, of the 1996 Major League Baseball draft. Durbin's major league debut came in a scoreless relief appearance, for the Royals, on September 26, 1999.

Professional career

Detroit Tigers
Durbin signed with the Tigers as a minor league free agent prior to the 2006 baseball season. He was a part of the 2006 International League champion Toledo Mud Hens, while also making 3 late-season appearances with the Tigers.

During 2007 spring training, Durbin was in the mix for one of the final spots in the Tigers bullpen. However, starting pitcher Kenny Rogers soon went on the disabled list with a shoulder injury, and the Tigers turned to Durbin to fill his spot in the rotation. Durbin served as a starting pitcher for several stints, before ultimately joining the bullpen. Pitching in relief, Durbin served several roles, including long relief and setup.

During a game on ESPN's Sunday Night Baseball against the Atlanta Braves, Durbin had a sacrifice fly for his first career RBI. He also recorded his first major league save in the same game. On December 12, 2007, Durbin was not offered a new contract by the Tigers and he became a free agent.

Philadelphia Phillies
On December 20, 2007, he signed with the Philadelphia Phillies to compete for a spot in their starting rotation. Though he lost out to Adam Eaton for a starting spot, Durbin enjoyed a strong season out of the bullpen for the eventual World Series Champions. In 2009, Durbin earned the first two postseason victories of his career, as he was the winning pitcher in Game 3 of the NLDS against the Colorado Rockies and Game 5 of the NLCS against the Los Angeles Dodgers. The latter clinched a second straight trip to the World Series for the Phillies, where they'd lose to the New York Yankees in six games. Durbin spent one more season with the Phillies before rejoining the Indians as a free agent on March 1, 2011.

Washington Nationals
Durbin signed a minor league contract with the Washington Nationals on February 1, 2012. He was released from Nationals after Spring Training.

Atlanta Braves
He was then signed by the Atlanta Braves to a one-year contract. With the Braves, he posted an ERA of 3.10.

Second Stint with Phillies
On January 28, 2013, Durbin signed a one-year deal with the Phillies with a base salary of $1.1 million and possible incentives totaling $350,000. The signing did not work out; the Phillies released Durbin on May 31, 2013, following a series of poor outings during which he had an ERA of 9.00.

Durbin retired on November 25, 2013.

Post-playing career 
In March 2022, it was announced that Durbin would join the Phillies radio broadcast team as a part-time color analyst.

Personal life
Durbin lives with his wife Crystal and sons Cade and Cavan and daughter Caris in Baton Rouge, Louisiana.

References

External links

1977 births
Living people
Kansas City Royals players
Cleveland Indians players
Arizona Diamondbacks players
Detroit Tigers players
Philadelphia Phillies players
Atlanta Braves players
Lansing Lugnuts players
Wichita Wranglers players
Omaha Royals players
Mahoning Valley Scrappers players
Akron Aeros players
Buffalo Bisons (minor league) players
New Orleans Zephyrs players
Toledo Mud Hens players
Major League Baseball pitchers
Baseball players from Illinois
People from Spring Valley, Illinois
Gulf Coast Royals players
Wilmington Blue Rocks players
Omaha Golden Spikes players
Clearwater Threshers players
Lehigh Valley IronPigs players